"Big Girls Don't Cry" is the eighteenth episode of the HBO original series The Sopranos and is the fifth of the show's second season. It was written by Terence Winter, directed by Tim Van Patten and originally aired on February 13, 2000.

Starring
 James Gandolfini as Tony Soprano
 Lorraine Bracco as Dr. Jennifer Melfi
 Edie Falco as Carmela Soprano
 Michael Imperioli as Christopher Moltisanti
 Dominic Chianese as Corrado Soprano, Jr.
 Vincent Pastore as Pussy Bonpensiero
 Steven Van Zandt as Silvio Dante
 Tony Sirico as Paulie Gualtieri
 Robert Iler as Anthony Soprano, Jr.
 Jamie-Lynn Sigler as Meadow Soprano *
 Drea de Matteo as Adriana La Cerva
 David Proval as Richie Aprile
 Aida Turturro as Janice Soprano
 Nancy Marchand as Livia Soprano *

* = credit only

Guest starring
 Jerry Adler as Hesh Rabkin
 Kathrine Narducci as Charmaine Bucco
 John Ventimiglia as Artie Bucco

Also guest starring

Synopsis
Adriana is proud of Christopher's screenwriting and enrolls him in an "Acting for Playwrights" course. He is applauded for his acting in an emotional scene in which he plays a son with his father. When a student asks him how he managed to cry he walks out, troubled and embarrassed. In the next class, he loses control when playing another scene with the student who played his father. Christopher punches him and kicks him as he lies on the floor. Adriana suggests that was because he was angry with his father for dying when Christopher was young. That night he throws away everything he has written.

Furio Giunta is now in New Jersey, a soldier with the Soprano crime family. Christopher was making collections from the owner of a tanning salon that is used to front a brothel, but the payments have been short. Tony sends Furio to obtain the money owed. Furio intimidates the girls and the customers. He breaks the owner's arm, shoots him in the kneecap, hits his wife, and spits on her.

With Furio's arrival, Tony promotes Paulie and Silvio, and refuses to promote Pussy. Pussy sees this as a betrayal and complains about it to Agent Lipari, who feels he has been passed over in his job as well. Sympathizing with each other, each complains about the declining standards of his organization.

Tony is becoming short-tempered and violent and is inflamed when he learns that Janice is using their mother's house as security for a loan. He goes to the house early one morning to confront her. He is taken aback when the door is opened by Richie, who says that he and Janice have revived the relationship they had many years ago. Tony says that their relationship was like Israel and Palestine. He leaves, saying with disgust, "She's your fucking problem now."

Tony visits Hesh Rabkin, seeking the comfort and guidance from him that he is not getting from Dr. Melfi. Hesh is sympathetic and tells Tony that Tony's father also had panic attacks. But Hesh gets bored listening to Tony and rambles on about his own experiences.

Dr. Melfi consults Dr. Kupferberg, and tries to understand her feelings about her gangster patient. Eventually, she decides to resume treating Tony. During their first session, while questions are being asked and answered, it seems they cannot stop smiling at each other.

Title reference
 The episode's title is taken from the name of a song by Frankie Valli and the Four Seasons, which is playing in the background during the restaurant scene in the episode. Valli would later have a role on the series as Rusty Millio.

Music 
The song played in the background of Artie's restaurant is the titular song of the episode, "Big Girls Don't Cry" by The Four Seasons.
The song playing when Christopher enters the tanning salon is "Touch It" by Monifah.
The song from Dr. Melfi's dream about Tony Soprano is "Optimistic Voices", a selection from the 1939 film classic, The Wizard of Oz.
The song played during Furio's party is "Rock the Boat" by The Hues Corporation.
The song played over the end credits is "White Mustang II" by Daniel Lanois.

Filming locations 
Listed in order of first appearance:

 Kearny, New Jersey
 Lou Costello Memorial in Paterson, New Jersey
 Long Island City, Queens
 Verona, New Jersey
 Glen Head, New York
 Great Kills, Staten Island

References

External links
"Big Girls Don't Cry"  at HBO

The Sopranos (season 2) episodes
2000 American television episodes
Television episodes directed by Tim Van Patten
Television episodes written by Terence Winter

fr:Cas de conscience (Les Soprano)